The Bournemouth Community Hebrew Congregation is an Orthodox synagogue in Lansdowne, Bournemouth, England. Its Rabbi is Adrian Jesner.

History

The congregation was formed in 1905.  Albert Samuel, brother of Liberal politician Herbert Samuel, laid the cornerstone of the current synagogue, which was built in 1911.

In 2019, the synagogue was made a Grade II listed building.

Architecture

The curvilinear roof line and window shape reveal what would have been a very contemporary Art Nouveau take on the Moorish Revival style that was extremely popular for synagogues.  The squat tower with its square dome and "attractive interlocking window arcade" mark the original entrance.  The  horseshoe-arched windows to the left are also part of the original facade.  

The new entrance, to the right of the tower, and   barrel-vaulted interior with a ladies' gallery is the result of a 1957–62 expansion.   The Torah Ark, also dating from the 1960s, is a mosaic design by craftsmen from Florence intended to echo the Temple of Solomon by featuring the Biblical columns Boaz and Jachin.

Future plans
The synagogue announced in early 2023 that it plans to sell its current building and move to smaller premises.

References

External links
 Official website
Bournemouth Hebrew Congregation on Jewish Communities and Records – UK (hosted by jewishgen.org).

1905 establishments in England
Art Nouveau architecture in England
Art Nouveau synagogues
Buildings and structures in Bournemouth
Jewish organizations established in 1905
Moorish Revival synagogues
Orthodox synagogues in England
Synagogues completed in 1911
Grade II listed buildings in Dorset
Grade II listed religious buildings and structures